Camila Maria Leiria de Castro (born 8 May 1982 in Rio de Janeiro) is a Brazilian sitting volleyball player. She is a member of the Brazil women's national sitting volleyball team.

She competed at the 2016 Summer Paralympic Games in Rio de Janeiro, winning the bronze medal, and 2020 Summer Paralympics, winning a bronze medal.

References 

1982 births
Living people
Brazilian women's sitting volleyball players
Paralympic bronze medalists for Brazil
Volleyball players at the 2016 Summer Paralympics
Medalists at the 2016 Summer Paralympics
Volleyball players from Rio de Janeiro (city)
Paralympic volleyball players of Brazil
Volleyball players at the 2020 Summer Paralympics
Medalists at the 2020 Summer Paralympics
21st-century Brazilian women